Mykhailivka is an urban-type settlement located in Zaporizhzhia Oblast, Ukraine. It was the administrative center of the now dissolved, Mykhailivka Raion. Population:

2022 Russian invasion of Ukraine 
During the 2022 Russian invasion of Ukraine, Russian troops entered and took over Myhailivka. People later went out to protest this and planted a Ukrainian flag in the town square.

References

Urban-type settlements in Vasylivka Raion
Populated places established in 1810